Jeremy Garth Jones (born 19 January 1979) is a Jamaican-born cricketer who plays for the Turks and Caicos Islands.  Jones is a right-handed batsman who bowls right-arm fast-medium.

Jones played a single Twenty20 match for the Turks and Caicos Islands against Montserrat in the 2008 Stanford 20/20 at the Stanford Cricket Ground.  He was run out for 2 runs in this match by Shernyl Burns, with the Turks and Caicos Islands making just 67 runs in their twenty overs.  Montserrat went on to win the match by 9 wickets, with Jones bowling two wicketless overs.

References

External links
Jeremy Jones at ESPNcricinfo
Jeremy Jones at CricketArchive

1979 births
Living people
Turks and Caicos Islands cricketers
Jamaican emigrants to the Turks and Caicos Islands